The Hino de Pernambuco (Anthem of Pernambuco), composed in 1908, is the official anthem of the Brazilian state of Pernambuco. Pernambuco is located in the Northeast region of Brazil. The state includes Olinda, the second oldest city in Brazil. The state's anthem exalts its beauty, historical achievements, and the past of the people of Pernambuco. The lyrics were written by Oscar Brandão da Rocha and the music was composed by Nicolino Milano.

It is a well-known music from Pernambuco because, apart from it being taught at local schools, it is often performed during sporting events like soccer, volleyball, and basketball. The song is also played in advertisements throughout the state.

In 2002, the Government of the State of Pernambuco, in partnership with the city of Recife and the Secretary of State for Tourism, promoted greater awareness of the hymn through its rewriting in various rhythms such as frevo, forró and manguebeat. Artists like Alceu Valenca, Dominguinhos, and Cannibal took part in this project.

Lyrics 
Coração do Brasil, em teu seio
corre o sangue de heróis - rubro veio
que há de sempre o valor traduzir.
És a fonte da vida e da história
desse povo coberto de glória,
o primeiro, talvez, no porvir.

(Estribilho)
Salve, ó terra dos altos coqueiros,
de belezas soberbo estendal,
nova Roma de bravos guerreiros,
Pernambuco imortal! Imortal!

Esses montes e vales e rios,
proclamando o valor de teus brios,
reproduzem batalhas cruéis.
No presente és a guarda avançada,
sentinela indormida e sagrada
que defende da pátria os lauréis.

(Estribilho)

Do futuro és a crença, a esperança,
desse povo que altivo descansa
como o atleta depois de lutar...
No passado o teu nome era um mito,
era o sol a brilhar no infinito,
era a glória na terra a brilhar.

(Estribilho)

A república é filha de Olinda,
alva estrela que fulge e não finda
de esplender com os seus raios de luz.
Liberdade um teu filho proclama,
dos escravos o peito se inflama
ante o sol dessa terra da cruz!

(Estribilho)

Brazilian music
Brazilian anthems
Brazilian patriotic songs